Merhawi Kesete (born 1 January 1986) is an Eritrean long-distance runner. In 2019, he competed in the men's marathon at the 2019 World Athletics Championships held in Doha, Qatar. He did not finish.

In 2015, he won the Hamburg Half Marathon and he set a new course record with a time of 1:00:52. In 2015, he also won the Ústí nad Labem Half Marathon held in Ústí nad Labem, Czech Republic.

References

External links 
 

Living people
1986 births
Place of birth missing (living people)
Eritrean male long-distance runners
Eritrean male marathon runners
World Athletics Championships athletes for Eritrea
21st-century Eritrean people